The Limenitidinae are a subfamily of butterflies that includes the admirals and relatives. The common names of many species and genera reference military ranks or – namely the Adoliadini – titles of nobility (e.g., count, duke, earl, and marquis), in reference to these butterflies' large size, bold patterns, and dashing flight. In particular, the light stripe running lengthwise across the wings of many Limenitidini has reminded earlier authors of officers' (e.g. admiral, commander, commodore) shoulder marks and epaulets.

In flight, many of these butterflies have the habit of flapping their wings, so the (usually) bright upperside and the cryptic underside alternate for the observer, then gliding for prolonged distances, with the motionless wings held outstretched. The common names of some Limenitidinae – "aeroplanes", "clippers", or "gliders" – refer to this flight pattern.

Systematics
The Biblidinae are sometimes merged here. The present subfamily is also sometimes included as a tribe Limenitidini in the Nymphalinae. But in fact, their closest living relatives seem to be the Heliconiinae.

The Limenitidinae are traditionally divided into four tribes, of which the Parthenini are the most basal lineage and the others form a close-knit and more apomorphic radiation. While this basic layout is likely to be fairly correct, a few genera cannot be easily assigned to the three "modern" tribes and seem to be somewhat intermediate. In particular, the delimitation of the Limenitidini versus the Neptini is in need of more study.

Genera and selected species

The genera of Limenitidinae, sorted per tribe in the presumed phylogenetic sequence and with some species also listed, are:

Tribe Parthenini Reuter, 1896
 Bhagadatta Moore, [1898]
 Parthenos  – clippers
Tribe Adoliadini Doubleday, 1845
 Abrota Moore, 1857
 Bassarona Moore, [1897] – marquises, dukes
 Bassarona durga – blue duke
 Bassarona iva – grand duke
 Bassarona recta – redtail marquis
 Bassarona teuta – banded marquis
 Dophla Moore, [1880] – dukes
 Dophla evelina – redspot duke
 Euthalia  – barons, dukes
 Euthaliopsis Neervoort van de Poll, 1896
 Lexias – archdukes
 Neurosigma Butler, 1868
 Tanaecia Butler, [1869] – counts
 Tanaecia cocytus – lavender count
 Tanaecia julii – common earl
 Tanaecia lepidea – grey count
 Tanaecia pelea – Malay viscount
 Aterica Boisduval, 1833 – forest-glade nymphs
 Bebearia Hemming, 1960
 Catuna Kirby, 1871 – pathfinders
 Crenidomimas Karsch, 1894
 Cynandra Schatz, [1887] – brilliant nymph
 Euphaedra Hübner, [1819] – typical foresters, figeaters
 Euptera Staudinger, [1891]
 Euriphene Boisduval, 1847
 Euryphaedra Staudinger, [1891]
 Euryphura Staudinger, [1891]
 Euryphurana Hecq, 1992 – noble commander
 Hamanumida Hübner, [1819] – guineafowl
 Harmilla Aurivillius, 1892 – elegant forester
 Pseudargynnis Karsch, 1892 – false fritillary
 Pseudathyma Staudinger, [1891] – false sergeants
Tribe Limenitidini Behr, 1864
 Adelpha Hübner, [1819] – sisters (sometimes included in Limenitis)
 Adelpha basiloides
 Adelpha bredowii – Mexico sister
 Adelpha californica – California sister (formerly in A. bredowii)
 Adelpha eulalia – Arizona sister (formerly in A. bredowii)
 Adelpha fessonia – band-celled sister
 Auzakia Moore, [1898]
 Auzakia danava – commodore
 Lelecella Hemming, 1939
 Limenitis – admirals
 Litinga Moore, [1898]
 Parasarpa Moore, [1898]
 Parasarpa dudu – white commodore
 Parasarpa zayla – bicolor commodore
 Patsuia Moore, [1898]
 Sumalia Moore, [1898]
 Sumalia daraxa – green commodore
 Sumalia zulema – scarce white commodore
 Moduza Moore, [1881] – commanders (sometimes included in Limenitis)
 Moduza procris – commander
 Tarattia Moore, [1898]
 Athyma – sergeants
 Pandita Moore, 1857
 Tacola Moore, [1898]

Tribe Neptini Newman, 1870
 Aldania Moore, [1896]
 Lasippa Moore, [1898]
 Neptis – typical sailers
 Pandassana Moore, [1898] (might belong in Neptis)
 Pantoporia Hübner, [1819] – lascars
 Pantoporia assamica – Assam lascar
 Pantoporia bieti – Tytler's lascar
 Pantoporia hordonia – common lascar
 Pantoporia karwara – Karwar lascar
 Pantoporia paraka – Perak lascar
 Pantoporia sandaka – extra lascar
 Phaedyma Felder, 1861 – aeroplanes
 Phaedyma shepherdi – common aeroplane

Incertae sedis
 Cymothoe Hübner, [1819] (Limenitidini or Neptini?) – typical gliders
 Cymothoe caenis
 Cymothoe hobarti – Hobart's red glider
 Cymothoe sangaris
 Harma Doubleday, [1848] – angular glider (Limenitidini or Neptini?)
 Kumothales Overlaet, 1940 (Limenitidini?)
 Lamasia Moore, [1898] (Limenitidini?)
 Lebadea Felder, 1861 (Limenitidini or Parthenini?)
 Lebadea martha – knight
 Pseudacraea – false acraeas (Limenitidini?)
 Pseudoneptis Snellen, 1882 – blue sailers (Limenitidini?)
 Chalinga Moore, 1898 (=Seokia Sibatani, 1943) (Limenitidini or Chalingini?)

Footnotes

References

  (2008): Markku Savela's Lepidoptera and Some Other Life Forms – Limenitidinae. Version of 31 August 2008. Retrieved 7 April 2009.
  (2007a): Tree of Life Web Project – Limenitidinae. Version of 15 January 2007. Retrieved 7 April 2009.
  (2007b): Tree of Life Web Project – Nymphalidae. Version of 19 February 2007. Retrieved 7 April 2009.

External links
 Checklist Nymphalidae
 Classification of Nymphalidae

 
Butterfly subfamilies
-
Taxa named by Hans Hermann Behr